2001 London bombing may refer to:

2001 BBC bombing
2001 Ealing bombing
May 2001 Hendon post office bomb